"The Borders" is a song performed by English musician Sam Fender. The song was released as a digital download on 2 September 2019 by Polydor Records as the seventh single from his debut studio album Hypersonic Missiles. The song peaked at number 59 on the UK Singles Chart. The song was written by Sam Fender and produced by Bramwell Bronte.

Background
In a press release, "The Borders is Fender's personal favourite song from the new album Hypersonic Missiles. At once deeply personal, traumatic event, Sam tells a story of two boys growing up together and then going their separate ways, the release reads. Memories inferred but not directly addressed. It's a storming tune with a powerful story, as so many of Sam's songs are.

Track listing

Charts

Certifications

Release history

References

2019 songs
Sam Fender songs
Polydor Records singles